as-Safira District is a district of Aleppo Governorate in northern Syria. Administrative centre is the city of as-Safira. At the 2004 census, the district had a population of 178,293.
   
The main towns are as-Safira and Khanasir. The main economic activity is agriculture. Since ancient times, as-Safira was a fertile area where grains and other crops were harvested.

Sub-districts
The district of as-Safira is divided into five sub-districts or nawāḥī (population as of 2004):

 In 2009, the northwestern area around the majority Kurdish city of Tell Aran was spun off al-Safira Subdistrict to establish Tell Aran Subdistrict.

References

 
Districts of Aleppo Governorate